David Gallup (July 11, 1808 – August 15, 1882) was an American politician who was the 59th Lieutenant Governor of Connecticut from 1879 to 1881. He previously served as President pro tempore of the Connecticut Senate.

References

 

1808 births
1882 deaths
Lieutenant Governors of Connecticut
Presidents pro tempore of the Connecticut Senate
19th-century American politicians